Jacob Finlay Evans (born 8 April 1998) is an English professional footballer who plays for Hungerford Town , as a midfielder.

Club career
Having spent 10 years in the Swindon Town youth set-up, Evans signed a professional contract in April 2016. Evans made his professional debut for the Wiltshire side, coming on as a second-half substitute, in the 3–0 win against Shrewsbury Town.

On 22 February 2017, Evans joined Irish side Waterford on loan until June 2017. On 24 February 2017, Evans made his Waterford debut in their 1–0 away defeat against Athlone Town, on the opening day of the 2017 campaign. Injury would blight most of Evans time with Waterford and his loan ended in May 2017 and he made his final appearance in the club's 3–0 defeat to League of Ireland champions Dundalk.

On 19 August 2017, Evans joined Southern League Premier Division side Farnborough on a one-month loan deal. On the same day, Evans made his debut for the club during their 3–1 home defeat against Redditch United, replacing John Oyenuga in the 66th minute. Following the conclusion of his one-month loan spell, it was announced that Evans had joined Farnborough on a permanent deal.

Following a trial period with Championship side Cardiff City, Evans joined their development side on a deal until the end of the 2017–18 campaign.

In January 2020, Evans joined Hemel Hempstead Town on loan.

On 14 December 2020, Evans joined National League South side Hungerford Town.

Career statistics

References

External links
 

1998 births
Living people
English footballers
Association football midfielders
Swindon Town F.C. players
Waterford F.C. players
Farnborough F.C. players
Cardiff City F.C. players
Hemel Hempstead Town F.C. players
Hungerford Town F.C. players
English Football League players